The oblique muscle of auricle (oblique auricular muscle or Tod muscle) is an intrinsic muscle of the outer ear.

The oblique muscle of auricle is placed on the cranial surface of the pinna. It consists of a few fibers extending from the upper and back part of the concha to the convexity immediately above it.

See also
 Intrinsic muscles of external ear

References

Ear
Muscles of the head and neck